Louis Frederique Paulette "Louisette" Malherbaud (28 April 1917 – 28 December 1999) was a French fencer. She competed in the women's individual foil event at the 1948 Summer Olympics.

References

External links
 

1917 births
1999 deaths
French female foil fencers
Olympic fencers of France
Fencers at the 1948 Summer Olympics
20th-century French women